An annular solar eclipse occurred at the Moon’s ascending node of the orbit on August 22, 1998. A solar eclipse occurs when the Moon passes between Earth and the Sun, thereby totally or partly obscuring the image of the Sun for a viewer on Earth. An annular solar eclipse occurs when the Moon's apparent diameter is smaller than the Sun's, blocking most of the Sun's light and causing the Sun to look like an annulus (ring). An annular eclipse appears as a partial eclipse over a region of the Earth thousands of kilometres wide. Annularity was visible in Indonesia, Malaysia, Papua New Guinea, Solomon Islands (Bellona Island and Rennell Island) and Vanuatu. Occurring only 5.2 days before apogee (Apogee on August 27, 1998), the Moon’s apparent diameter was 3.6% smaller than average.

Images

Related eclipses

Eclipses of 1998 
 A total solar eclipse on February 26.
 A penumbral lunar eclipse on March 13.
 A penumbral lunar eclipse on August 8.
 An annular solar eclipse on August 22.
 A penumbral lunar eclipse on September 6.

Solar eclipses 1997–2000

Saros 135 

It is a part of Saros cycle 135, repeating every 18 years, 11 days, containing 71 events. The series started with partial solar eclipse on July 5, 1331. It contains annular eclipses from October 21, 1511, through February 24, 2305, hybrid eclipses on March 8, 2323, and March 18, 2341, and total eclipses from March 29, 2359, through May 22, 2449. The series ends at member 71 as a partial eclipse on August 17, 2593. The longest duration of totality will be 2 minutes, 27 seconds on May 12, 2431.

Metonic series

Notes

References

Photos:
 An Annular Eclipse of the Sun APOD 8/24/1998, from Mersing on the East Coast of Malaysia

1998 8 22
1998 in science
1998 8 22
August 1998 events